Microcephaly deafness syndrome is an extremely rare genetic disorder which consists of microcephaly, congenital hearing loss, mild intellectual disability, speech delay, low height, and facial dysmorphisms (such as low-set cup-shaped ears, protruding lower lips, micrognathia, epicanthal folds, drooping lower lip, and a rather big distance between both eyebrows). Only 2 cases of this disorder have been recorded in medical literature; a mother and her son. The researchers who discovered this disorder (Kawashima and Tsuji, in 1987) later suggested that this disorder was inherited in an autosomal dominant manner, although the genetic cause of it has never been found. It's estimated to affect less than 1 in a million people worldwide.

References 

Rare genetic syndromes
Syndromes with microcephaly